István Batházi (born 16 December 1978 in Budapest) is a male medley swimmer from Hungary, who competed three times for his native country at the Summer Olympics in 1996 and 2000. He won the European title in the men's 400 m individual medley in 2000 (Helsinki).
In 2009 Istvan set the 200m(LC) Individual Medley Masters World Record for 30-34 age group.

Awards
 Hungarian swimmer of the Year (1): 2002

References

1978 births
Living people
Hungarian male swimmers
Male medley swimmers
Swimmers at the 1996 Summer Olympics
Swimmers at the 2000 Summer Olympics
Olympic swimmers of Hungary
Swimmers from Budapest
European Aquatics Championships medalists in swimming
South Carolina Gamecocks men's swimmers